Menadarva (meaning grave of St Derwa) is a hamlet in the parish of Camborne, Cornwall, England, UK. The Red River flows through the hamlet and on 9 March 1885 the machinery and materials of the Menadarva Lower Tin-Stream was put up for auction.

The Norman font of the church of All Saints' Church, Tuckingmill came from the medieval chapel of St Derwa at Menadarva.

References

Camborne
Hamlets in Cornwall